Battle of al-Shihr may refer to:

 Battle of al-Shihr (1523)
 Battle of al-Shihr (1531)
 Battle of al-Shihr (1548)